William Latimer ( – 1545) was an English priest and scholar of Ancient Greek. He had court connections, and was also prominent in the intellectual life of his time.

Biography
Latimer studied at Oxford University, attaining the degree of Bachelor of Arts before being admitted as a fellow of All Souls College, Oxford in 1489. In the 1490s Latimer went to Italy in order to study Greek, he was eventually awarded  an MA by the University of Ferrara in 1502.

Shortly after returning to England in 1502, Latimer took holy orders. Throughout the rest of his life he combined his travels and studies with a career in the priesthood. He also spent several spells serving as a teacher at Canterbury College, Oxford, where, amongst others, he taught Reginald Pole.

Latimer was one of the foremost scholars of his age, a fact attested by his selection as Pole's tutor and his role as an advisor to Henry VIII on the theological implications of his divorce from Catherine of Aragon. Latimer was also a correspondent of Thomas More and Desiderius Erasmus, the latter specifically seeking Latimer's help during his translation of the New Testament (something Latimer denied in a letter).

Although the precise date of his death is unknown, Latimer died at some point between April and October 1545 – the dates that his will was successively made and proven.

References

External links
 
  

1460s births
1545 deaths
English Renaissance humanists
16th-century English clergy
English theologians
Scholars of Ancient Greek
University of Ferrara alumni
Fellows of All Souls College, Oxford
15th-century English people